John Hobson may refer to:

John A. Hobson (1858–1940), English economist and imperial critic
John M. Hobson (b. 1962), author of The Eastern Origins of Western Civilisation
John Hobson (politician) (1912–1967), British Conservative Member of Parliament and Attorney-General